MS Stena Scandica is a RoPax ferry, owned by Stena Line and it operates on the Baltic Sea between Nynäshamn, Sweden and Ventspils, Latvia.

History
Stena Scandica was built in July 2005, as Lagan Viking, entering service with Norse Merchant Ferries later the same month. It was named after the River Lagan, the principal river in Belfast. A few months later, Norse Merchant Ferries was acquired by Norfolkline.

In July 2010, Norfolkline was acquired by DFDS. The vessel was renamed Lagan Seaways during her refit in August 2010. Later that same year, DFDS sold its Northern Irish operations to Stena Line. The sale included the Belfast–Birkenhead route and Lagan Seaways sister ship, Mersey Seaways. In August 2011, she was renamed Stena Lagan

In March 2020, Stena Edda arrived from China to replace Stena Lagan on the Belfast to Birkenhead route. Stena Lagan departed for Tuzla, Istanbul on 14 March 2020, for lengthening with a  midsection. Beside the lengthening, she received a new bow. The ship was renamed Stena Scandica before the end of 2020.

On August 29, 2022 a fire started in a cooling container on the car deck whilst en route to Latvia, close to Gotska Sandön off the Swedish east coast. Although the crew could extinguish the fire without injuries, it caused a loss of power, and the ferry drifting towards the coast of Gotland. Several passengers were evacuated by helicopter to the nearby ferry M/S Visby who continued toward Gotland. After several hours, two of the engines could be started. On August 30, Stena Scandica arrived in Nynäshamn, Sweden under her own power.

Route
Stena Lagan operated on the Irish Sea, on the Birkenhead to Belfast route, with her sister ship Stena Mersey. In all, the total journey time on board the ship was 8 hours. From early 2021, Stena Scandica operates on the Baltic Sea between Nynäshamn, Sweden and Ventspils, Latvia.

On board
Stena Lagan carried up to 720 passengers. As Stena Scandica, the ship's capacity was increased to 970 passengers, with the 2020-21 lengthening of the ship.

References

External links

 DFDS Seaways website
 Norfolkline website
 Faktaom Fartyg

Ferries of the United Kingdom
Ferries of Northern Ireland
Ferries of England
Ferries of Sweden
Ferries of Latvia
2005 ships
Scandica
Ships built by Cantiere Navale Visentini
Ships built in Italy